The Jordanian Ambassador in Washington, D.C. is the representative of the government in Amman (Jordan) to the government of the United States.

List of representatives
Below is a sortable list of individuals appointed as Ambassador Extraordinary and Plenipotentiary from the Hashemite Kingdom of Jordan to the United States of America.

The Ambassador can be contacted through the Embassy of the Hashemite Kingdom of Jordan located at 3504 International Drive, N.W., North Cleveland Park, Washington, D.C. 20008.

See also 
 Jordan–United States relations
 Embassy of Jordan, Washington, D.C.
 United States Ambassador to Jordan

References

External links
 Embassy of the Hashemite Kingdom of Jordan
 Government of Jordan

 
United States
Jordan